The 2015–16 season was Associazione Calcio ChievoVerona's 9th consecutive season in Serie A. The club competed in Serie A, finishing 9th, and in the Coppa Italia, where Chievo was eliminated in the third round by Salernitana (0-1 after extra time).

ChievoVerona made a good start to the season, taking 10 points from the first five games, and ultimately ended up fluctuating in mid-table throughout most of the season. The 9th-place finish was the club's best placement since 2006 and would be their best result in the club's 11-year stay in Serie A between 2008 and 2019.

Valter Birsa, whose loan became permanent, and Simone Pepe were amongst the club's signings before the start of the year.

Players

Squad information
In italics players who left the club during the season.

Transfers

In

Loans in

Out

Loans out

Pre-season and friendlies

Competitions

Serie A

League table

Results summary

Results by round

Matches

Coppa Italia

Statistics

Appearances and goals

|-
! colspan="10" style="background:#FFFF00; color:blue; border:2px solid blue; text-align:center"| Goalkeepers

|-
! colspan="10" style="background:#FFFF00; color:blue; border:2px solid blue; text-align:center"| Defenders

|-
! colspan="10" style="background:#FFFF00; color:blue; border:2px solid blue; text-align:center"| Midfielders

|-
! colspan="10" style="background:#FFFF00; color:blue; border:2px solid blue; text-align:center"| Forwards

|-
! colspan="10" style="background:#FFFF00; color:blue; border:2px solid blue; text-align:center"| Players transferred out during the season

Goalscorers

Last updated: 15 May 2016

Clean sheets
Last updated: 15 May 2016

References

A.C. ChievoVerona seasons
Chievo